This is a list of characters that appear in the British claymation series Wallace and Gromit and Shaun the Sheep, created by Aardman Animations.

Overview

Main characters

Wallace

Wallace is a middle-aged man who lives at 62 West Wallaby Street, Wigan, along with his dog Gromit. His last name is never given. He usually wears a white shirt, brown wool trousers, a green knitted pullover, and a red tie. He is fond of cheese, especially Wensleydale, and crackers.

Nick Park, his creator, said: "He's a very self-contained figure. A very homely sort who doesn't mind the odd adventure". He is loosely based on Park's father, whom Park described in a radio interview as "an incurable tinkerer". He described one of his father's constructions, a combination beach hut and trailer, as having curtains in the windows, bookshelves on the walls and full-sized furniture bolted to the floor. The way he dresses and his passion for cheese is based on an eccentric school teacher.

Wallace was voiced by Peter Sallis until 2010, and Ben Whitehead (in 2009 and since 2011) in Wallace & Gromit's Grand Adventures and Wallace & Gromit's Musical Marvels commercials and apps.

An inveterate inventor, Wallace creates elaborate contraptions that often do not work as intended. Their appearance is similar to the illustrations of W. Heath Robinson and Rube Goldberg. Nick Park has said of Wallace that all his inventions are designed around the principle of using a "sledgehammer to crack a nut".  Some of Wallace's contraptions are based on real-life inventions. For example, his method of waking up in the morning utilizes a bed that tips over to wake up its owner, an invention that was exhibited at The Great Exhibition of 1851 by Theophilus Carter.

Wallace's official job varies; in A Close Shave, he is a window washer. In The Curse of the Were-Rabbit, Wallace runs a humane pest control service, keeping the captured creatures (nearly all of which are rabbits) in the basement of his house. In the most recent short, A Matter of Loaf and Death, he is a baker. While he has shown himself to be skilled to some degree in the businesses he creates, an unexpected flaw in the inventions he uses to assist him in his latest venture, or simply bad luck, often ends up being his downfall.

In the first photo shown on The Curse of the Were-Rabbit, it is revealed that Wallace once had a full head of hair and a very thick moustache with muttonchops. In the photo that shows Gromit's graduation at Dogwarts, he had lost his beard but still had a little hair, in the form of sideburns just above his ears. In The Wrong Trousers, he still uses a hair-dryer. In A Matter of Loaf and Death, when Wallace is talking to Gromit, a picture is seen behind Gromit of Wallace with a brown beard and brown hair.

Wallace has had three love interests. The first was Wendolene Ramsbottom, which ended quickly when Wendolene told Wallace that she had a calcium allergy. The second was Lady Tottington in The Curse of the Were-Rabbit, whom Wallace fondly calls "Totty". In A Matter of Loaf and Death, Wallace becomes engaged to Piella Bakewell, but this ended when she turns out to be a murderess who hated bakers and was eaten by crocodiles upon trying to escape justice. In Musical Marvels, after the montage of his three love interests, he refers to them as "the ones that got away".

Gromit

Gromit is a Beagle who is Wallace's pet dog and best friend. Gromit is very intelligent, having graduated from "Dogwarts University" ("Dogwarts" being a pun on "Hogwarts", the wizard school in the Harry Potter books) with a double first in Engineering for dogs. He likes knitting, playing chess, reading the newspaper, tea, and cooking. His prized possessions include his alarm clock, dog bone, brush, and a framed photo of himself with Wallace. He is very handy with electronic equipment and an excellent airplane pilot. He often threatens the plans of the villains he and Wallace encounter in their adventures.

Gromit has no visible mouth and expresses himself through facial expressions and body language. Peter Hawkins originally intended to voice Gromit, but Park dropped the idea when he realized how Gromit's expressions could easily be made through small movements. Despite which, he has often barked in films like "The Wrong Trousers" (where he also made a growl) and "A Close Shave".

Many critics believe that Gromit's silence makes him the perfect straight man, with a pantomime expressiveness that drew favourable comparisons to Buster Keaton. He does at times make dog-like noises, such as yelps and growls. Nick Park says: "We are a nation of dog-lovers and so many people have said: 'My dog looks at me just like Gromit does!'"

Generally speaking, Gromit's tastes are more in vogue than those of Wallace; this being one of the many ways they contrast with each other as characters. Gromit seems to have a significant interest in the encyclopedia, classical and philosophical literature, and popular culture, including film and music. Electronics for Dogs has been a firm favourite since A Grand Day Out, and in The Wrong Trousers Gromit's bookshelves feature titles such as Kites, Sticks, Sheep, Penguins, Rockets, Bones, and Stars, while he is seen reading The Republic, by Pluto (a nod to the Disney character of the same name and a pun on Plato) and Crime and Punishment, by Fido Dogstoyevsky (a pun on Fyodor Dostoyevsky). Gromit's various possessions make extensive use of puns: A Matter of Loaf and Death features "Pup Fiction" (Pulp Fiction), "The Dogfather" (The Godfather), "Where Beagles Dare" (Where Eagles Dare), "Bite Club" (Fight Club) and "The Bone Identity" (The Bourne Identity) all as book titles, and "Citizen Canine" (Citizen Kane) as a film poster. His taste in music has been shown to cover Bach, "Poochini" (a play on Puccini) and "McFlea" (McFly).

Gromit gains his first love interest in A Matter of Loaf and Death, when he becomes attached to Fluffles, a poodle belonging to Piella Bakewell.

NASA named one of its new prototype Mars explorer robots after Gromit in 2005.

On 1 April 2007, HMV announced that Gromit would stand in for Nipper for a three-month period, promoting children's DVDs in its UK stores.

In 2010, Empire magazine placed Gromit first in their list of The 50 Best Animated Movie Characters. Empire wrote that: "Gromit doesn't ever say a word, but there has never been a more expressive character (animated or otherwise) to grace our screens".

In 2013 and 2018 there were auctions of two trails of 81 Gromit statues to help raise money for charity. The first one raised £3.5 million for an expansion of Bristol Royal Hospital for Children.  The Gromit which attracted the highest bid was Gromit Lightyear, designed by Disney Pixar based on the Toy Story character Buzz Lightyear which sold for £65,000.

Introduced in A Grand Day Out

The Cooker

The Cooker is the given name to a coin-activated robot made out of an oven and storage cabinet that patrols the moon. It is very protective of the moon and becomes hostile when it discovers Wallace and Gromit have landed there. It secretly has a lifelong dream of skiing.

As well as being called The Cooker, an audio adaptation of A Grand Day Out refers to it as The Moon Machine.

Introduced in The Wrong Trousers

Feathers McGraw
Feathers McGraw is the main antagonist in The Wrong Trousers. He is a local zoo penguin who pretends to Wallace to be a friendly house guest, but in reality is a criminal mastermind intending to steal an expensive diamond using Wallace's latest invention, The Techno Trousers. Upon escaping from the zoo, he manages to successfully pass himself off as a chicken by wearing a red rubber glove on his head.
Feathers also returns as the antagonist in the 2003 video game, Wallace & Gromit in Project Zoo where he has escaped from the zoo, then plans to kidnap the animals and turn the Zoo into a diamond mine. A poster of Feathers can be seen in A Matter of Loaf and Death right before Piella Bakewell enters the local zoo, indicating that he has once again escaped.

His name is featured on the back of a newspaper following his capture in The Wrong Trousers.

Introduced in A Close Shave

Shaun the Sheep
Shaun (voiced by Justin Fletcher) is a sheep who first appears in A Close Shave. At first he was a stray sheep who belonged to Preston but broke free of the truck containing him. He unintentionally barges into Wallace and Gromit's house and is occasionally seen in some of their antics. He is sometimes seen wearing a sweater which was given to him after his wool was shaved.

In his own 2007 series, he is the leader of the flock. He is a clever, confident sheep, prone to mischief but equally adept at getting himself and his friends out of it. As there is no dialogue,  he communicates, like all the sheep, entirely through bleating. However, he often explains his ideas to the flock by drawing diagrams on a blackboard. He is a good friend of Bitzer, the farm dog, though this does not stop him from playing pranks on the dog at times.

In his 2015 spin-off film, Shaun and the flock go off to the big city to save the farmer.

Like with Gromit, there was a Shaun trail statue auction in 2015 in Bristol, but this time it was also held in London. It raised £1.1 million. The Gromit "globe-trotter" by Sarah Matthews sold for £28,000.

In the second film, Farmageddon, Shaun meets an alien called Lula and attempts to send her back into space.

Wendolene Ramsbottom

Wendolene (voiced by Anne Reid) is the owner of the town's Wool Shop and Wallace's first love interest. She was the owner of Preston following her father's death. At the end of A Close Shave, Wallace tries to warm up to her by inviting her to his house for cheese but is heartbroken when he learns it brings her out in a rash.

Preston

Preston is a cyberdog (robot) invented by Wendolene's father, and is the main antagonist in A Close Shave. Preston was created to watch over and protect Wendolene if her father ever died, but the cyberdog subsequently turned out to be evil. He is the head of a sheep kidnapping operation that turns them into dog food. When put in control of the Mutton-O-Matic, he sees an opportunity to make use of all the shorn sheep.

He is a spoof of the Terminator as he has a robotic endoskeleton under fake fur.

Introduced in The Curse of The Were-Rabbit

Lord Victor Quartermaine

An arrogant, cruel, upper-class bounder who is fond of hunting and the main antagonist in The Curse of The Were-Rabbit, he is rarely seen without his rifle and his hunting dog Philip. He wears a toupee and hates Anti-Pesto. His hunting rifle is apparently a high caliber bolt-action model. It soon becomes clear in the film that Victor's only interest in Lady Tottington is her vast fortune which he is eager to get his hands on. After Lady Tottington discovers that Victor knew that the were-rabbit was Wallace all along, he reveals that all he wants is her money. His surname is similar to Allan Quatermain, the British novelist H. Rider Haggard's big-game hunter character.

Philip

Victor's vicious but cowardly hunting dog who resembles a Miniature Bull Terrier, and was the secondary antagonist of the curse of were-rabbit. He and his master will do anything to stop the Were-Rabbit, although Philip is bright enough to know that the Were-Rabbit is beyond his hunting skills and that Gromit, closer to his own size, is a better prospect as the target of premeditated violence. He also owns a lady's purse decorated with flowers for spare change.

Lady Campanula Tottington

A wealthy aristocratic spinster with a keen interest in both vegetable-growing and 'fluffy' animals. For 517 years, her family has hosted an annual vegetable competition. Lady Tottington asks Wallace to call her "Totty" (which is a British term for attractive upper-class women) and develops a romantic interest in him. Her forename, Campanula is also the name of a bellflower and her surname is taken from the Lancashire village of Tottington.

Mrs. Mulch

Mrs. Mulch is a prominent, tough woman who has a maternal fixation on her gigantic pumpkin.
Mr. Mulch speaks very little and has a pair of dentures, which he used briefly to knock out a thieving rabbit.

Mr. Thripp

A neurotic spinster who goes to pieces over his fears for the vegetable competition's future after the truth of the were-rabbit is revealed.

Mr. Growbag

An elderly resident of Wallace and Gromit's neighbourhood and a founding member of the town's veg grower's council, he constantly recalls memories of incidents from previous Vegetable Competitions—comparing them to what may happen to the forthcoming one. Two of the "disasters" he mentions are The Great Slug Blight of '32, "when there were slugs the size of pigs", and the Great Duck Plague of '53.

Hutch

Originally just another captive rabbit, Hutch receives special treatment, and his name, after an attempt to brainwash him and his fellows goes wrong. He was the first to be suspected of being the Were-Rabbit. Everything that Hutch says is a quotation from Wallace (though, surprisingly, some of the lines were originally spoken by Wallace after the incident with the Mind-Manipulation-O-Matic). Hutch wears clothes like Wallace's, including his slippers and tank top.

The Were-Rabbit

Beware the moon! In the dark of the night, someone or something has been terrorizing the gardens and veg-plots in Wallace and Gromit's neighborhood. When it turns out to be a giant veg-eating-rabbit-monster, it's up to the Anti-Pesto team to track it down and prevent it from ruining Lady Tottington's competition. Gromit does his best, but Wallace never seems to be around to help out when the monster strikes. Later in the movie, it's revealed that the Were-Rabbit was Wallace.

Police Constable Albert Mackintosh

Police Constable Albert Mackintosh is the local village constable who judges the Giant Vegetable Contest. With the havoc it creates every year, however, he would rather it did not happen at all.

Reverend Clement Hedges

Reverend Clement Hedges is the local vicar and the first person in the village to witness the Were-Rabbit. He describes the full horror of his encounter with the beast, but Victor refuses to believe him. However, when Victor discovers the true identity of the beast, he turns to the vicar for advice on how to kill it. Reverend Hedges appears to have a wide range of knowledge on the habits and the slayings of supernatural animals and has a whole cupboard filled with the weapons to defeat them. Although his name appears in the credits, it is never said in the film.

Introduced in A Matter Of Loaf And Death

Piella Bakewell
Piella Bakewell (voiced by Sally Lindsay) is the main antagonist of a Matter of Loaf and Death. She was formerly the mascot of Bake-O-Lite Bread but she was fired because she was overweight to ride the 'Bake-O-Lite Balloon' so she begins affairs with a chain of 12 local bakers before murdering them, believing it was their fault for her becoming overweight. With her charming nature and captivating smile, Piella is normally seen as very kind but she is actually very angry, fierce, evil and revealed as the serial killer, who intends for Wallace to become the 13th of her "baker's dozen". Having grown rich from her modeling days and lives in a mansion filled to the brim with mementos of her former glory, at the end she gets eaten by a crocodile because she escaped Wallace's using the Bake-O-Lite Balloon which dropped her because she was too big to ride it. She pretends to fall in love with Wallace; however, she actually hates him. She has a poodle called Fluffles.

Fluffles
Fluffles is Piella's beautiful if slightly nervous pet poodle. Withdrawn and lacking in confidence due to many years of unkind treatment, Fluffles is nonetheless a caring soul who strikes a romantic chord with Gromit. Piella acts very kind-hearted to her but at the end she is very cruel towards Fluffles. When Piella dies at the end, Fluffles joins Wallace and Gromit's side. Fluffles then continues with Wallace and Gromit and they sell bread all together.

Baker Bob
(Voiced by Ben Whitehead), Baker Bob is a baker who was killed by Piella. It is her 12th murder crime. At right at the start of the film, Piella is shown killing Baker Bob with a rolling pin.

Introduced in Shaun the Sheep

Bitzer

The farmer's loyal, long-suffering sheepdog, Bitzer dresses for work in a blue knit cap, black collar, knitted wristlet, and large official-looking wrist-watch. He carries a clipboard and walks upright or on all fours as needed. He communicates, canine-fashion, via barks, growls, and the occasional whimper. He also gives instructions to the flock by blowing a whistle. Despite a tendency to be caught listening to music, he takes his job very seriously, to the point of occasionally letting his power go to his head. He is, however, a generally good friend to Shaun and does his best to keep the whole flock out of trouble. He is sensible and a stickler for the rules. Bitzer usually does a good job of keeping Shaun in check. But in the movie, even he can not put the brakes on Shaun's crazy plans for a day away from the farm. An experienced 'peace-keeper', Bitzer is used to covering Shaun's tracks and shielding Farmer from his frequent mischief-making. Torn between his job as a faithful companion to Farmer and the role of 'big brother' to Shaun, Bitzer always tries to do the best for everyone. But Shaun's latest antics test Bitzer's patience to the limit.

Shirley

She is the biggest member of the flock. A gentle giant, she is usually seen placidly eating, though she is intimidating enough to have defended Shaun from Pidsley the cat. She is so big that large objects routinely disappear into (or are deliberately hidden in) her fleece. She quite often gets stuck herself, needing the other sheep to push, pull or even sling-shot her out of trouble. However, her size can also come in very handy when what is needed is a battering ram or similarly immovable object.

She is happy to tag along when Shaun proposes an adventure. Shirley is delighted to find that the Big City is a treasure trove of exciting new foods—it makes a change from chewing on grass all day long. But Shirley soon realizes there will not be much time for fine dining when Farmer needs finding and there is an evil animal catcher on the loose.

Timmy

Shaun's little cousin is the flock's only lamb, and thus often the innocent center of the chaos. He appears to be a toddler in this series and is often seen sucking a dummy. The spinoff series Timmy Time chronicles his later adventures in preschool. He enjoys being in the spotlight. He is three years old in sheep years and later turns four years old in the episode "Timmy's Birthday". In many of the episodes he gets into trouble; however, he learns from his mistakes and often tries to help the other characters out when he can. Timmy's noise is baaa; he is the smallest member of the Flock. Timmy always has a smile on his face and loves to tag along with his hero Shaun. Wherever Shaun goes, Timmy follows, even if that means getting into the odd scrape or two. Never seen without his orange teddy, Timmy might be teeny but he is as bright as a button and has some unexpected uses when the flock hits the Big City. There is no way he's missing out on the fun, and in the movie, Timmy gets a little more excitement than he bargained for.

Timmy got his own TV series in 2009 where went to preschool with his friends. The series lead to two short films in 2011 and 2012— a Christmas and summer show, respectively.

Timmy's Mother

Timmy's mother and Shaun's aunt who wears curlers in her topknot and is a bit careless about maternal duties, even using Timmy once as a makeshift paintbrush. But when her offspring goes astray, she is inconsolable until he is safely back in her care. She likes to look her best, even when she is running around keeping an eye on her energetic offspring. Something of a 'mother figure' to the rest of the Flock, Timmy's Mum keeps a watchful eye over the Mossy Bottom gang, but she can not always steer them away from trouble. When the Flock takes off to find the Farmer in the Big City, she follows close behind, using her motherly instincts to keep everybody safe in this big and scary new world.

Nuts

He is quite an eccentric, but useful sheep and usually, like the rest of the flock, accompanies and helps Shaun. But the thing that makes him stand out from the flock is that he has two different shaped eyes. He is the charming eccentric of the Flock, with an unusual way of looking at the world that sometimes confuses his woolly companions. A classic 'daydreamer' who lives in a world of his own, Nuts is the quirkiest character in the Mossy Bottom clan. No one knows what goes on his head but he brings his own unique skills to the table when the Flock finds themselves deposited in the middle of the Big City.

The Flock

The Flock tends to follow Shaun and one another, like typical sheep, and are obedient to orders and generally form one big happy, if sometimes fractious, family group. Unlike Shaun, however, they are not particularly bright, which becomes a problem when combined with their ongoing fascination with the human world. It's usually Shaun and Bitzer who sort out the resulting mess.

The Twins
Are sheep who are twins.

Hazel
Is a member of the Flock.

The Farmer

The farmer is a bespectacled, balding man who runs the farm with Bitzer at his side and acts as the flock's primary if unwitting nemesis. His livestock's main concern is to ensure he remains completely oblivious to their unusual sentience, a task made easier by his conventional, unobservant nature but complicated by his enthusiasm for picking up new hobbies. He can be heard frequently making wordless noises or muttering under his breath just audibly enough for the viewer to pick up on his meaning. His disastrous attempts at dating are a running joke of the series. In the 2015 movie, he is referred to as Mr. X by those who do not know his identity. Poor Farmer thinks he has got it all under control down at Mossy Bottom Farm. As he potters around the fields, his faithful dog Bitzer by his side, Farmer is completely blind to the mischief going on right under his nose. Though he is prone to the occasional grump, Farmer and the animals rub along well most of the time, even if their madcap escapades cause all sorts of chaos and destruction. A man of simple tastes who likes the quiet life, Farmer enjoys nothing more than a cup of tea in front of the TV after a hard day farming. In the 2019 sequel, he builds an Alien theme park called Farmageddon in order to raise funds for a new combine harvester.

The Naughty Pigs

This group of swine, whose pen is adjacent to the sheep-field, are bullies to Shaun and his flock, always trying to antagonize them and get them into trouble. They are, however, scared of Bitzer (though they still take the chance to bully him whenever possible), and they get told off by the Farmer in "Pig Trouble".

Pidsley

The Farmer's yellow cat, Pidsley, is a minor character in series 1 and the main antagonist of series 2. He desires to be the sole recipient of the Farmer's attention and thus is jealous of Bitzer. He also dislikes the sheep, thinking them stupid and beneath him.

Mower Mouth

The Goat, Mower Mouth, who first appears in the episode of the same name, is an unstoppable eating machine. While not an unfriendly character, all his considerable energy is focused on his next meal. He thus routinely causes trouble for Shaun and the flock, as also seen in "Shaun the Farmer" and "Saturday Night Shaun". He is also the parent of Kid in Timmy Time.

The Bull

The Bull is belligerent, powerful, and easily provoked by Shaun's antics and the color red. He appears in "The Bull", "Saturday Night Shaun", "Who's the Mummy?" and "Heavy Metal Shaun".

The Ducks

The Ducks make frequent appearances. In the first series, a single duck suffers collateral damage due to Shaun's exploits in "Off the Baa!", "Tidy Up", and "Bath Time". Sometimes the duck is seen with his lady friends. In series two there are two ducks; in series three, they have once again been replaced with a single, pure white duck.

The Aliens

The Aliens appear in "Shaun Encounters", "The Visitor" and "Caught Short Alien" and "Cat Got Your Brain" and briefly in "Spring Lamb". They are green and have one large eye on the top of their heads. Despite their clearly advanced scientific technology—which frequently causes trouble for the farm animals—they exhibit human-like behavior and generally jovial personalities.

The Granny

The Granny is a short-tempered, short-sighted old lady, appearing in "Takeaway" and "Save the Tree". She also appears in "Two's Company", holding a cart and "The Big Chase", forcing the pigs to give her a lift in their car. She is renowned for hitting people (or animals) with her handbag when they annoy her.

The Pizza Delivery Boy

A young man who rides a moped (which Bitzer often "borrows" to chase after the sheep) the Pizza Delivery Boy works in the local pizzeria. He also moonlights as a postman in "Saturday Night Shaun".

The Farmer's Girlfriend

The Farmer's Girlfriend appears for the first time in series 2. She appears to be adventurous and an animal lover, patting Bitzer and Shaun and offering food to Timmy.

The Farmer's Niece

Appearing in "The Farmer's Niece" and "The Rabbit", the Farmer's Niece appears to be a fan of horses and irritates Shaun, Bitzer and the flock. She is also one of the few humans to know what the flock is up to.

Introduced in Timmy Time

Harriet

Harriet is a Heron who speaks through caws and clicks. She is one of two teachers; her noise is a squawk.

Osbourne

Osbourne is an owl who is the other teacher in the class. He is father to Otus. Osbourne's noise is hoot-hoot.

Yabba

Yabba is a Duck very similar to Timmy in personality and very friendly with him. Yabba's noise is a quack.

Paxton

Paxton the Piglet is characterized by his appetite for food and his weight. He wears a blue sweater and is never seen without it. Paxton's noise is oink. He loves kits.

Mittens

Like other kittens, Mittens hates getting her fur dirty (or wet) and is rather sensitive. Mittens' noise is mee-ew-ew. In some episodes, she seems to have feelings for Timmy. She always loves playing with picnics.

Ruffy

Ruffy is an energetic puppy, but he can be mentally rather slow. Ruffy's noise is rowf.

Apricot

Apricot is a hedgehog pup. She is very quiet and skittish. When startled or frightened by someone or something she rolls up into a ball. Apricot's noise is hicoooo, though she rarely speaks.

Stripes

Stripes is a badger cub. He is a bit sleepy and slow as badgers are nocturnal. Stripes' noise is eh-eh.

Mikey

Mikey is a mouse. He is very happy and hungry. Mikey's noise squeak-squeak.

Otus

Otus the owlet enjoys helping and looks up to Osbourne. He can typically be found reading and is very sensitive, sometimes copying his father Osbourne. Otus is commonly confused as being female due to his feminine voice and pink and purple feathers. Otus's noise is too-hoo.

Finlay

Finlay is an excitable fox pup, full of energy, whose noise is yip-yap.

Bumpy

Bumpy is a green caterpillar, who is not part of the class but has many background appearances in the show. Bumpy makes a soft purring noise.

Introduced in Shaun the Sheep Movie

Slip

Slip is introduced in Shaun the Sheep Movie. She may not be the prettiest pooch on the block, but Slip is simply adorable. With her goofy teeth and gentle nature, Slip only has to bat her long eyelashes to make a new friend, and it is not long before Shaun falls under her spell. At the end, she is adopted by a bus driver.

A. Trumper
An animal warden who despises animals, Trumper is the movie's bad guy—a power-crazed villain who rules the city's animal shelter with an iron grip. With his high-tech equipment and all-seeing eyes, nothing escapes his attention. At the end of the film, he gets launched by the bull into a manure pile, and is later fired. The credits reveal that he now works for a food company in a chicken suit.

The Celebrity
The Celebrity is given a haircut by The Farmer, and also witnessed the restaurant incident earlier in the film.

Introduced in The Farmer's Llamas

The Llamas

The Llamas (Hector, Raul and Fernando) are three prank-pulling llamas who are bought by the Farmer after being tricked by Shaun. Hector is the short's main villain. In the end, Hector and his minions get pulled away by a bald man and they were played by their buyer’s daughter which they weren’t pleased about.

Introduced in A Shaun the Sheep Movie: Farmageddon

Lu-La 
An alien child from another planet introduced in A Shaun the Sheep Movie: Farmageddon.

Agent Red 
A woman who runs the Ministry of Alien Detection (MAD) and is obsessed with aliens, as a result of seeing Lu-La's parents when she was a girl and being humiliated at school when she mentioned it. She's the (former) main antagonist of the second film.

Mugg-1N5 
A robotic probe that works for Agent Red and the MAD.

The Hazmats 
A group of people wearing hazmat suits that work for MAD.

Ub-Do and Me-Ma 
The parents of Lula.

Farmer John 
A farmer who witnesses Lu-La's arrival.

References

External links

 
 The Wallace & Gromit Children's Charity
 BBC One – Wallace and Gromit's World of Invention

 
Fictional English people
Fictional inventors
Fictional dogs
Clay animation
Stop motion characters
Animated human characters
Film characters introduced in 1989